The Sydney Marathon is a marathon held annually in Sydney, Australia each September. The event was first held on the 30th of April 2000 and called The Host City Marathon as a test event for the Sydney 2000 Olympic Games, and has continued every year since, as a legacy of the 2000 Summer Olympics.  The marathon is categorized as a Platinum Label Road Race by World Athletics.

The Sydney Marathon is part of the Sydney Running Festival, which also includes a half marathon, a 10K run, and a  race.

History 

The Sydney Marathon started in April 2000, following the same course as the marathon during the 2000 Summer Olympics. The women's race in 2001 was won by Krishna Stanton, who had never run a marathon before, and was doing the event as a result of a challenge from a friend.

In 2014 the marathon was awarded a Silver Label Road Race by the International Association of Athletics Federations (IAAF), then in December 2014 the race was awarded a Gold Label Road Race in time for the 2015 race and it is now a Platinum Label Road Race.

The 2020 in-person edition of the race was cancelled due to the coronavirus pandemic, with all entries automatically transferred to 2021, and all registrants given the option of also running the race virtually for free. Elkanah Kibet won the 2022 race in 2:07:02, a new course record, and the fastest marathon time run on Australian soil.

In July 2022, organisers of the race announced that they were applying to be added to the list of World Marathon Majors.

Course 

The marathon course initially followed the same course that was used in the 2000 Summer Olympics.

In 2010 the marathon course was changed to flatten it out which, according to the organisers, makes it "a faster, more scenic and spectator friendly course."

The marathon runs on a point-to-point course that begins in Bradfield Park, Milsons Point, crosses over the Sydney Harbour Bridge, and ends in front of the Sydney Opera House.

Other awards 

To date, eight runners have competed in every Sydney Marathon, and have been dubbed "Blue Line Legends".

In addition, runners who have completed at least 10 marathons are eligible to be inducted into the Bridge Club.

Other races 

In addition to the marathon, a half marathon,  "Bridge Run", and a  "Family Fun Run" are also held under the banner of the Sydney Running Festival.

The Bridge Run has since returned to being an AIMS certified  distance.

All the races finish at the Sydney Opera House, except for the fun run, which ends at the Sydney Conservatorium of Music less than a kilometre from the Opera House.

Winners 
Key:  Course record

 Source (up to 2018):

Multiple wins

By country

Notes

References

Marathons in Australia
Sports competitions in Sydney
Annual sporting events in Australia